Vimla Pradhan is an Indian Politician from Bharatiya Janata Party. She was the state legislative assembly member from Simdega from 2009 to 2019. She was minister of Social Welfare, Women and Child Development and Tourism in Government of Jharkhand. Vimla Pradhan has been nominated and awarded as ‘Best MLA’ of 2017 by the committee of Legislative Assembly of Jharkhand.

References

Members of the Jharkhand Legislative Assembly
Living people
Women in Jharkhand politics
People from Simdega district
Jharkhand MLAs 2014–2019
1957 births
Bharatiya Janata Party politicians from Jharkhand
21st-century Indian women politicians
21st-century Indian politicians
Nagpuria people